Lyubomira Kazanova (born 23 May 1996) is a Bulgarian group rhythmic gymnast.

Career 
Kazanova was member of the Bulgarian group that competed at the 2016 Summer Olympics in Rio de Janeiro, Brazil. (Together with Reneta Kamberova, Mihaela Maevska, Tsvetelina Naydenova, Hristiana Todorova), they won the Group All-around bronze medal. They dedicated their medal to their teammate Tsvetelina Stoyanova, who had attempted to commit suicide and fell from her apartment in Sofia.

Detailed Olympic results

Personal life 
Her father Milko Kazanov competed in canoe sprint for Bulgaria and is a four-time Olympian [1992-2004]. He won a bronze medal in the K2 1000m at the 1996 Olympic Games in Atlanta.

References

External links
 
 
 

1996 births
Living people
Bulgarian gymnasts
Olympic gymnasts of Bulgaria
Olympic medalists in gymnastics
Olympic bronze medalists for Bulgaria
Gymnasts at the 2016 Summer Olympics
Medalists at the 2016 Summer Olympics